Orcus was a god of the underworld, punisher of broken oaths in Etruscan and Roman mythology. As with Hades, the name of the god was also used for the underworld itself. Eventually, he was conflated with Dis Pater and Pluto.

A temple to Orcus may once have existed on the Palatine Hill in Rome. It is likely that he was transliterated from the Greek daemon Horkos, the personification of oaths and a son of Eris.

Origins

The origins of Orcus may have lain in Etruscan religion. The so-called “Tomb of Orcus”, an Etruscan site at Tarquinia, is a misnomer, resulting from its first discoverers mistaking a hairy, bearded giant for Orcus; it actually depicts a Cyclops.

The Romans sometimes conflated Orcus with other gods such as Pluto, Hades, and Dis Pater, all gods of the underworld. The name “Orcus” seems to have been given to the malicious and punishing side of the ruler of the underworld, as the god who tormented evildoers in their afterlife. Like the name Hades, “Orcus” could refer both to the underworld itself, as well as its ruling deity. In the charitable interpretation for such a place, it was believed to be an abode for purification of the souls of the deceased.

Orcus was chiefly worshipped in rural areas; he had no official cult in the cities. This remoteness allowed for him to survive in the countryside long after the more prevalent gods had ceased to be worshipped. He survived as a folk figure into the Middle Ages, and aspects of his worship were transmuted into the wild man festivals held in rural parts of Europe through modern times. Indeed, much of what is known about the celebrations associated with Orcus come from medieval sources.

Persistence and later usage

From Orcus's association with death and the underworld, his name came to be used for demons and other underworld monsters, particularly in Italian where orco refers to a kind of monster found in fairy-tales that feeds on human flesh.

The French word ogre (appearing first in Charles Perrault's fairy-tales) may have come from variant forms of this word, orgo or ogro; in any case, the French ogre and the Italian orco are exactly the same sort of creature.

Ariosto
An early example of an orco appears in Ludovico Ariosto's Orlando Furioso (1516), as a bestial, blind, tusk-faced monster inspired by the Cyclops of the Odyssey.

Tolkien
The orco from Orlando, along with the Old English word orc (in the sense of an ogre, like Grendel), was part of the inspiration for Tolkien's orcs in his The Lord of the Rings In other manuscripts Tolkien wrote a side-note on the word:
The word used in translation of Q urko, S orch, is orc. But that is because of the similarity of the ancient English word orc, 'evil spirit or bogey', to the Elvish words. There is possibly no connexion between them. The English word is now generally supposed to be derived from Latin Orcus.

Also, in an unpublished letter sent to Gene Wolfe, Tolkien also made this comment:
Orc I derived from Anglo-Saxon, a word meaning demon, usually supposed to be derived from the Latin Orcus – Hell. But I doubt this, though the matter is too involved to set out here.

From this use, countless other fantasy games and works of fiction have borrowed the concept of the orc.

Other modern-era use
 The name "Orcus" appears in the Dungeons & Dragons role-playing game as Orcus, Prince of the Undead.

 Orcus appears as a character in Christopher Moore's novel A Dirty Job (2006).

 The Kuiper belt object 90482 Orcus is named after Orcus. This was because Orcus was sometimes considered to be another name for Pluto, and also because Pluto and 90482 Orcus are both plutinos.

 In the TV series Happy! (2017-2019), Orcus possesses members of the Scaramucci crime family.

 Image of Orcus is used on the book cover The complete short stories of Ambrose Bierce. Compiled and Edited by Ernest Jerome Hopkins. 1970 Doubleday

 Orcus appears as a character in Qui Nguyen's play She Kills Monsters (2011.

See also
 Demogorgon

Notes

References

Other sources not cited

External links

 "Tomb of the Orcus", Tarquinia

90482 Orcus
Roman gods
Roman underworld
Underworld gods
Hades